José María de Marco Pérez (born 23 June 1963) is a Spanish lightweight rower. He won a gold medal at the 1983 World Rowing Championships in Duisburg with the lightweight men's four. He competed at the 1992 Summer Olympics and the 1996 Summer Olympics.

References

1963 births
Living people
Spanish male rowers
World Rowing Championships medalists for Spain
Olympic rowers of Spain
Rowers at the 1992 Summer Olympics
Rowers at the 1996 Summer Olympics
Sportspeople from Seville
20th-century Spanish people